Clare-Marie Beeson, SBS is a New Zealand-born lawyer who served as a judge in the Hong Kong Judiciary for over 29 years.

Early life and career
Beeson was born in 1948 in New Zealand.  She was admitted as a solicitor and barrister in New Zealand in 1972 and was in private practice.

In 1975, she joined the Hong Kong Legal Department as Crown Counsel and was promoted to Senior Crown Counsel in 1980.

Judicial career 
Beeson joined the Hong Kong Judiciary as a magistrate in 1984 and became principal magistrate in 1990.  She was appointed a District Court judge in 1991.

On 1 December 1997, Beeson moved from her position as Chief District Judge to the Court of First Instance of the High Court of Hong Kong.

In 2013, Beeson retired from the bench. She was awarded the Silver Bauhinia Star for her service in the Hong Kong Judiciary, particularly for her work presiding over serious criminal cases in the High Court.

Between 2014 and 2016, Beeson sat as a Deputy Judge of the High Court of Hong Kong.

Personal life 
Beeson is married to Ian Wingfield, former Solicitor-General of Hong Kong. They have two daughters, Clarissa and Clementine Beeson.

References

Living people
Recipients of the Silver Bauhinia Star
Hong Kong judges
1948 births